Bryant Township was a township in Logan County, North Dakota, United States. The former township was merged into the West Logan Unorganized Territory.

The township was located in the western part of the county, surrounding the city of Napoleon, and it bordered the following other townships within Logan County:
 Glendale Township — north
 Dixon Unorganized Territory (defunct, formerly Dixon Township) — east
 Red Lake Township — southeast corner
 Starkey Township (defunct) — south
 Sealy Township — northwest corner

References

Defunct townships in North Dakota
Townships in Logan County, North Dakota
Townships in North Dakota